Moegle is a surname. Notable people with the surname include:

Dicky Moegle (1934–2021), American football player
Eddie Moegle (1896–1983), American football player
Fritz Moegle (1916–1986), Austrian art director